Lower is a surname. Notable people with the surname include:
 Arthur R. M. Lower (1889–1988), Canadian historian 
Britt Lower (born 1985), American actress
Cyrus B. Lower (1843–1924), American Civil War Medal of Honor recipient
Geoffrey Lower (born 1963), American actor
Oswald Bertram Lower (1863–1925), Australian entomologist
Richard Lower (physician) (1631–1691), Cornish inventor of blood transfusion
Robert A. Lower (1844–1918), American Civil War Medal of Honor recipient
William Lower (astronomer) (1570–1615), English astronomer
William Lower (dramatist), English dramatist and translator